Sekyra ('The Axe') is a 1966 novel by the Czech author Ludvík Vaculík. Like Milan Kundera's The Joke (1967), The Axe was an influential novel in Czechoslovakia during the 1960s cultural awakening.

References

1966 Czech novels